Michael Stephen De Placido (born 9 March 1954) is an English former footballer who played as a winger.

Career
Born in Scarborough, North Yorkshire, De Placido started his career with York City as an amateur before signing a professional contract in March 1972. He was capped by England at youth level during 1972. He made 11 appearances for York before moving into non-League football with Scarborough, where he made four appearances and scored one goal in all competitions. He later played for Prince of Wales in the Scarborough Sunday League.

References

1954 births
Living people
Sportspeople from Scarborough, North Yorkshire
English footballers
England youth international footballers
Association football wingers
York City F.C. players
Scarborough F.C. players
English Football League players
Footballers from North Yorkshire